Princess Amelia was launched in 1798 at Liverpool. She made eight complete voyages as a slave ship in the triangular trade in enslaved people. After the end of British participation in the Trans-Atlantic slave trade, she became a merchantman. She was probably the Princess Amelia, from Liverpool, that was lost in 1810.

Career
Princess Amelia first appeared in Lloyd's Register (LR) in 1798.

1st slave voyage (1798–1799): Captain John Livingston acquired a letter of marque on 9 October 1798. He sailed from Liverpool on 21 November 1798. Princess Amelia acquired her slaves at Bonny and arrived at Kingston, Jamaica on 14 May 1799 with 441 slaves. She sailed from Kingston on 17 June and arrived back at Liverpool on 17 September. She had left Liverpool with 51 crew members and she had suffered 20 crew deaths on her voyage.

2nd slave voyage (1799–1800): Captain Livingston sailed from Liverpool on 26 December 1799. Princess Amelia acquired slaves at Bonny and arrived at Demerara on 20 June 1800 with 295 slaves. She sailed from Demerara on 2 July and arrived back at Liverpool on 12 September. She had left Liverpool with 38 crew members and suffered eight crew deaths on her voyage. 

3rd slave voyage (1801): Captain Livingston sailed from Liverpool on 20 May 1801. Princess Amelia acquired slaves at Bonny and arrived at St Vincent on 20 October. She sailed from St Vincent on 4 November and arrived back at Liverpool on 27 December. She had left Liverpool with 40 crew members and she had suffered two crew deaths on her voyage.

4th slave voyage (1802–1803): Captain Thomas Mullion sailed from Liverpool on 2 April 1802. Because the voyage began during the Peace of Amiens, Captain Thomas Mullion did not acquire a letter of marque. Princess Amelia acquired slaves at Angola and arrived at St Croix on 6 October 1802. She left there on 13 December and arrived back at Liverpool on 2 February 1803. She had left with 33 crew members and had suffered one crew death on her voyage.

5th slave voyage (1803–1804): War with France had resumed before Princess Amelia sailed on her fifth slaving voyage. Captain Donald McDonald acquired a letter of marque on 25 May 1803. Princess Amelia sailed from Liverpool on 19 June. She acquired her slaves at Bonny and arrived at Demerara on 10 December with 300 slaves. She sailed from Demerara on 19 January 1804 and arrived back at Liverpool on 26 March. She had left with 33 crew members and had suffered one crew death on her voyage.

5th slave voyage (1804–1805): Captain McDonald sailed from Liverpool on 22 June 1804. Princess Amelia acquired slaves at Bonny and arrived at Dominica on 11 December with 309 slaves. She sailed for Liverpool on 22 February 1805 and arrived back there on 1 April. She had sailed from Liverpool with 41 crew members and she had suffered seven crew deaths on her voyage.

6th slave voyage (1805–1806): Captain James Dickson acquired a letter of marque on 20 June 1805, and sailed from Liverpool on 11 July. Princess Amelia gathered slaves at Bonny and arrived at Dominica on 14 February 1806, after stopping at Barbados on 18 January. Princess Amelia sold at Dominica. She sailed from Dominica on 17 March and arrived back at Liverpool on 1 May. She had left Liverpool with 44 crew members and had suffered five crew deaths on her voyage.

7th slave voyage (1806–1807): Captain Dickson sailed from Liverpool on 27 June 1806. Princess Amelia acquired slaves at Bonny and arrived at Dominica on 5 December. She sailed from Dominica on 26 February 1807 and arrived back at Liverpool on 12 April. 

8th slave voyage (1806–1807): The Slave Trade Act 1807, which banned British vessels from participating in the Trans-Atlantic slave trade, took effect on 1 May 1807. However, by clearing customs before the deadline, Captain Dickson was able to squeeze out one last legal slave-trading voyage even though she did not actually sail until 18 May. 

Princess Amelia gathered slaves at Bonny and arrived at Dominica on 21 November with 282 slaves. She arrived at London on 14 August 1808 from Grenada. She had left Liverpool with 40 crew members and she had suffered 11 crew deaths on her voyage.

Captain Robert Allam acquired a letter of marque on 6 May 1809.

Fate
In February 1810 Lloyd's List reported that Princess Amelia, from Liverpool, was lost in "River St Mary's.

Princess Amelia was last listed in Lloyd's Register in the volume for 1810.

Citations

1798 ships
Liverpool slave ships
Age of Sail merchant ships of England
Maritime incidents in 1810